Win Rosenfeld (born February 22, 1978) is an American screenwriter and producer, best known for his collaborations with Jordan Peele.

Early life 
Rosenfeld was born in New York, New York on February 22, 1978. He graduated from Grinnell College in May 2000.

Career
In October 2017, Rosenfeld was hired as the president and CEO of Jordan Peele's company Monkeypaw Productions. Before he joined Monkeypaw Productions, Rosenfeld produced several cult television series, including Nova ScienceNow and Dark Net. After his promotion, Rosenfeld has produced more popular television series such as the 2019 reboot of The Twilight Zone, Weird City, Lorena, The Last O.G., and Hunters. He also co-wrote the screenplay for the supernatural slasher film Candyman (2021), alongside Peele and Nia DaCosta. In October 2020, Rosenfeld and Peele signed on to produce the remake of Wes Craven's 1991 horror film The People Under the Stairs.

Feature films

Television series

References

External links
 
 
 Rosenfeld's Monkeypaw Productions

1978 births
21st-century American male writers
21st-century American screenwriters
American male screenwriters
American male television writers
American television writers
Grinnell College alumni
Living people
People from New York City
Screenwriters from New York (state)